Glynis Leanne Nunn-Cearns (née Saunders, formerly Nunn), OAM (born 4 December 1960) is a former Australian heptathlete, the first Olympic champion in the event. Born in Toowoomba, Queensland, she began competing in athletics at age 9, when she was a student at Toowoomba South State School.

She starred in several events, and was thus a natural competitor in the pentathlon (which was replaced by the heptathlon in 1981). In 1978, she qualified for the Commonwealth Games, but could not compete because of an injury.

By the time of the 1982 Commonwealth Games held in Brisbane, she had married decathlete Chris Nunn, and that year the couple moved to Adelaide in South Australia where Chris was studying for a physical education degree at the South Australian College of Advanced Education. In the first heptathlon competition at the Games, she upset the English favourite and took the title. At the inaugural World Championships a year later, she was placed 7th.

Because of the 1984 Summer Olympics boycott, Nunn was one of the medal candidates for the Olympic title, too. The competition was incredibly close, with five athletes fighting for the medals. After the competition, there was confusion about who had won, but when the smoke cleared, Nunn had scored 6390 points, five more than runner-up Jackie Joyner-Kersee. In addition to her gold medal, Nunn was also placed fifth in the 100 m hurdles event, and seventh in the long jump.

After the Olympics, Nunn abandoned the heptathlon, and switched to hurdling. She was hampered by many injuries, but managed to win a bronze medal in the high hurdles event at the 1986 Commonwealth Games. She quit sports in 1990.

Recognition
In 1985, Nunn received a Medal of the Order of Australia and was inducted into the Sport Australia Hall of Fame. She received an Australian Sports Medal in 2000.

References

External links

Profile

1960 births
Living people
Athletes (track and field) at the 1984 Summer Olympics
Australian heptathletes
Olympic athletes of Australia
Athletes (track and field) at the 1978 Commonwealth Games
Athletes (track and field) at the 1982 Commonwealth Games
Recipients of the Medal of the Order of Australia
Recipients of the Australian Sports Medal
Sport Australia Hall of Fame inductees
Sportspeople from Toowoomba
Commonwealth Games medallists in athletics
Medalists at the 1984 Summer Olympics
Commonwealth Games gold medallists for Australia
Commonwealth Games bronze medallists for Australia
Olympic gold medalists for Australia
Olympic gold medalists in athletics (track and field)
People educated at Toowoomba State High School
Australian female athletes
Medallists at the 1982 Commonwealth Games